Don't Go Near the Park is a 1979 American Independent supernatural horror film directed by Lawrence D. Foldes, and starring Aldo Ray, Meeno Peluce, Tamara Taylor, Robert Gribbin, Barbara Bain, and Linnea Quigley. Its plot follows a brother and sister, both cursed in prehistoric times, who remain on earth and must subsist on the entrails of young people; in an attempt to break their curse and achieve immortality, the brother conceives a child as a virginal sacrifice.

Filmed in Los Angeles, Don't Go Near the Park was then-19-year-old Foldes' directorial debut. He had previously produced the commercially successful exploitation film Malibu High (1979). The film was released theatrically in September 1981. It gained notoriety when it was successfully prosecuted for obscenity in the United Kingdom and placed on the "video nasty" list due to its violent content. In the intervening years, it was released on the home video market under several alternate titles, such as Night Stalker and Curse of the Living Dead.

Critical response to the film was largely negative, and it attracted commentary in subsequent decades for its themes of cannibalism, incest, and pedophilia. In 2006, Dark Sky Films released a DVD edition featuring the original U.S. theatrical cut.

Plot
After being cursed by their mother, Petranella, Tra and Gar, a caveman brother and sister, are forced to live their lives preying on young people by devouring their entrails to retain youth. The nature of the curse allows it to be lifted after 12,000 years— a full cycle of the zodiac— after which one of the siblings must conceive a child to use as a virgin sacrifice in order to achieve immortality.

Millennia later, in 1965, the siblings subsist by stalking young people in a Los Angeles park, consuming their entrails to imbibe their lifeforce. As the 12,000 years reach their end, Gar plans to conceive a child. Using the name Mark, he rents a room in the home of a beautiful young woman, soon marrying her before conceiving a daughter, Bondi. Mark becomes obsessed with Bondi's welfare, and his attention to her causes his marriage to disintegrate in the intervening years. On Bondi's sixteenth birthday, Mark gives her an ancient amulet that belonged to his mother. Bondi's mother storms out of the house during the birthday party, abandoning them.

Bondi subsequently runs away, hitching a ride with three adult male hippies. When they attempt to gang-rape her in the back of the van, Bondi invokes her father, clutching to the amulet, which begins glowing. The van begins to drive out of control, crashing off a rural bridge before bursting into flames; Bondi survives, however, having managed to escape before the crash. Bondi wanders into an abandoned house near the park, where Tra, withering from her lack of sustenance, resides in seclusion. Bondi is unaware that Tra, who calls herself Patty, is in fact her aunt. Tra immediately realizes who Bondi is upon seeing the amulet.

Bondi is met by Nick, an 8-year-old boy who has been taken in by Patty, and who sees her as a grandmother figure. She also meets Cowboy, another runaway who lives there. Bondi is initially terrified by Patty's grotesque appearance, but Nick and Cowboy assure her she is harmless. Cowboy explains that Patty dons a cloak so as to appear as a witch, and has concocted a tall tale about the land suffering "Petranella's Curse" in order to keep people away. Meanwhile, while selling flowers on the street, Nick meets Taft, a local writer and historian who befriends him. In conversations, Taft explains the dark history of the local park and the deaths that have occurred there for centuries, warning Nick not to go near it.

Late at night, Nick witnesses Patty entering the park in a mask and follows her. He watches from a distance as she strangles, disembowels, and cannibalizes a female victim. When she removes the mask, her youthful appearance is restored. Horrified, Nick flees back to the house to notify Bondi and Cowboy but finds the house empty. Meanwhile, Bondi, having been drugged by Patty, awakens in a cave alongside Cowboy. She is confronted by her father, who attempts to force her to strip nude to begin the ritual, but Patty intervenes and stops him. After a fire breaks out in the cave, Patty urges Bondi to swallow the amulet, which she does. Upon doing so, Bondi becomes possessed by Petranella, taking on her withered appearance. Petranella reanimates the corpses of Patty and Mark's victims, which they have stored in the cave, and forces them to kill and consume Mark and Patty.

After Petranella's spirit leaves Bondi's body, Bondi and Cowboy flee and find Nick in one of the tunnels. They escape through a crumbling cave wall with the help of Taft, who has been searching for Nick in the park. The three spend the night at Taft's home and return to visit Patty's home the next day. Upon arriving, they are notified by a city official that the home is being demolished. Pondering where to go, the three venture into the park and begin playing at a playground. Nick climbs a slide and asks Bondi to push him down. Instead, Bondi begins to dig her fingernails into his abdomen to disembowel him. While doing so, she knowingly smiles.

Cast

Analysis and themes
Film scholars David Kerekes and David Slater note that Don't Go Near the Park contains various themes of cannibalism, incest, and "subliminal paedophilia." Kerekes and Slater cite several sequences that allude to inappropriate sexual conduct, including the scene in which 8-year-old Nick attempts to grope Bondi's breasts while she is sleeping. They also note that the camera provides views up actress Tammy Taylor's skirts.

Kerekes and Slater also suggest that the character of Taft, an aging man who strikes a friendship with the young Nick, alludes to a pedophilic relationship: "He takes the young boy home, where he lives alone, and invites him to stay with him as his special friend. Towards the end of the film, the three youngsters—Cowboy, Bondi and Nick—are all sleeping half-naked in Taft's apartment while he looks on, smiling."

Production

Concept
Don't Go Near the Park was co-written and directed by first-time director Lawrence D. Foldes, who was 19 years old at the time of its filming. Prior to making the film, Foldes had produced the exploitation film Malibu High (1979), which had been a major box office success. The story, conceived by Linwood Chase, was partly inspired by a series of disappearances (primarily of children) that had occurred over the 20th century in Griffith Park in Los Angeles.

Casting
The film marked actress Linnea Quigley's first major role, and she was cast based on modeling photos Foldes had come across of her. Many of the actors in the film were credited under pseudonyms; Robert Gribbin, who portrayed Mark, is credited as Crackers Phinn, while Barbara Bain, who played Patty, was credited as Barbara Monker. Aldo Ray, an established film veteran, was cast as Taft, the writer who befriends the runaway youth in the film.

Filming
Principal photography took place in Los Angeles, California in 1979, under the working title Sanctuary of Evil. Filming occurred primarily in Griffith Park, as well as the Paramount Ranch. The cave sequences were filmed in the Bronson Caves in Griffith Park. Foldes makes a cameo appearance in the film as one of the three young men who attempt to rape Bondi. The film's budget was around $200,000. Robert A. Burns served as the film's art director, and helped craft some of the special effects.

Star Quigley recalled of the shoot: "I sent my picture in, and they called me and I read for the part of this woman that bears a child. They’re supposed to age me, like she’s all grown up and everything, and I had a real babyface then, but they used the worst makeup, and I just looked like I had stipple on. It was crazy. It looked so bad. The movie was terrible."

Release

Box office
Don't Go Near the Park was released theatrically on September 11, 1981 in Florida. The film screened in various U.S. cities throughout the remainder of the year, including Montgomery, Alabama, and Phoenix, Arizona. By 1984, the film had grossed $390,000 at the U.S. box office.

Director Foldes stated in 1983 that the Cannon Group had acquired further distribution rights to the film (as well as Foldes' subsequent feature, Skycopter) for regional screenings, though a Cannon representative stated at that time that "there isn't much going on with either movie."

Home media
In the United Kingdom, Don't Go Near the Park was successfully prosecuted for obscenity and placed on the "video nasty" list, though it was subsequently removed. The film was released on VHS in the United States under various alternate titles: In 1986, Thriller Video released it under the title Night Stalker, and it was re-released in 1989 by Electric Productions under the title Curse of the Living Dead.

In 2006, Dark Sky Films released a special edition DVD of the film. This same year, the film was passed uncut in the United Kingdom by the British Board of Film Classification.

Reception
Don't Go Near the Park received mostly negative reviews upon its release. Candice Russell of the Fort Lauderdale News panned the film, criticizing its "slipshod" camerawork and production values, adding: "Everything about this exploitation picture is cut-rate, from the fakey-looking wigs to special effects worthy of a freshman filmmaker. The acting is disastrous and director-producer Foldes knows it, so he tries to substitute intense closeups for a lack of dramatic feeling, to no avail." Joe Bob Briggs, however, praised the film as the best among similarly-titled films such as Don't Look in the Basement (1973).

Donald Guarisco of AllMovie wrote, "There are movies that are bad and then there are movies so bad they are mindblowing. Don't Go Near the Park is a perfect fit in the latter category." Todd Martin from HorrorNews.net panned the film, calling it "a goofy, boring, ridiculous mess of a film that is just pretty much pointless in every possible way."
Ian Jane from DVD Talk called it "truly terrible and almost unwatchable", criticizing the film's acting, plot, lack of sense, and poorly executed gore scenes. 
The Terror Trap awarded the film half a star out of four, calling it "terrible", and panned the acting, clumsy pacing, and disjointed plot.

The film wasn't without its supporters.
Dan Budnik from Bleeding Skull! liked the film, calling it "Strange and compelling and occasionally incredibly stupid".

References

Sources

External links
 
 
 

1979 films
1979 horror films
American supernatural horror films
Films about cannibalism
Films about curses
Films about immortality
Films about runaways
Films about cavemen
Films set in 1965
Films set in Los Angeles
Films shot in Los Angeles
Video nasties
Golan-Globus films
American splatter films
1980s English-language films
1970s English-language films
1970s American films
1980s American films